Supanat Chalermchaichareonkij (born 31 July 1986) is a Thai singer, actor, and the winner of UBC Academy Fantasia season 2 in 2005.

Profile
Supanat "Aof" Chalermchaichareonkij was born at Chainat, Thailand. He is the third and the last son of the family who run one of the biggest construction material businesses in the province. He graduated with a master in Business Administration from Dhurakij Pundit University in Bangkok and hopes to return home to help the family run the family business.

Chalermchaichareonkij loves to sing since he was young and tried to participate in many singing contests. He won and failed from time to time until he was most successful in UBC Academy Fantasia Season 2, the most popular reality show in Thailand. Chalermchaichareonkij became the winner of UBC AF Season 2 with the highest popular vote from audience across the country. It was claimed that he won all hearts because of his friendly personality and his talents in Thai country (Luk Thung) songs, which he had just practiced one year before joining the contest. Apart from Luk Thung, Chalermchaichareonkij can also sing very well in other styles, pop, rock, hip-hop, etc. He is also well-known from the title Krarok Noi (Little Squirrel), which is named by his trainer from the show based on his personality.

After winning the reality show, Chalermchaichareonkij and all UBCAF II contestants released an album called Ray Khai Fun (Dream for Sale) with UBC Fantasia (Now called True Fantasia) in October 2005, following with his debut solo album Show Aof in March 2006. The album contains various styles of music including pop, hip-hop and Luk Thung, but the pop song called Plian Jai Noi Dai Mai (Could you change your mind?) climbed up to No. 1 in the SEED Chart Top 20 of 97.5 SEED F.M which is broadcast to all fans nationwide for three weeks as well as remaining No.1 in various national radio charts.

In October 2006, UBCAF I and UBCAF II contestants released an all-star album called Dream Team together and Chalermchaichareonkij can show his talent in Luk Thung songs again in the song Hua Jai Wang Wang (The Single Man's Heart), the only Luk Thung song in the album.

After the first solo album and the all-star album, Chalermchaichareonkij has realized that he would like to entertain his fans from all ages and he is most happy when he sings Luk Thung songs. Therefore, his second solo album appears to be pure Luk Thung songs instead of a combination of pop music and Luk Thung as in the first album. It is even more special because there are 4 Luk Thung super stars, including Arphaporn Nakhonsawan, Pornchita Na Songkhla, Pamela Bowden and Luk Nok Supaporn, to join and feature in this album. The song Rak Thon Rak Nan (Enduring Love, Lasting Love) featured by all four Luk Thung super stars, which is also the name of this album, went to no. 1 for six weeks in T-Top chart which is ranked by T-Channel, the most popular cable Luk Thung music station in Thailand. 500,000 copies of this album were sold and Chalermchaichareonkij was well-known among Luk Thung audience.

In December 2007, he was invited to join in a special show in Just the Two of Us, the most popular reality show on Hunan TV in China, to promote Luk Thung songs.

In 2009, Chalermchaichareonkij released another album "Su Kho Sa Mo Sorn" with Nim from True AF 5. This album recovered popular songs in the past and included only one new song "Phu Chai Ngai Ngai". Chalermchaichareonkij released an album "Rue Doo Hang Kwam Rak" again in early 2010 from a cooperation of True Fantasia and Sure Audio and another two singles "Khad Kwan Aob Aun Yang Rang" and "Roy Yim Peun Nam Ta" in late 2010 with other AF winners from Season 1–6.

Besides these albums, Chalermchaichareonkij also starred in drama series and movies. In October 2010, the contract with True Fantasia was expired and now Chalermchareonkij signed a 5-year contract with Grammy Gold.

Works

Music
 Album "Ray Khai Fun (Dream for Sale)" (AF2) released October 2005
Listen
 Album "Show Aof" (The 1st solo album) released March 2006
Listen
 Album "Dream Team" (All Star AF 1–2) released June 2006
Listen
 Album "AF The Musical: Ngern Ngern Ngern (All Star AF 1-2-3) released May 2007
Watch
 Album "Rak Thon Rak Nan" (The 2nd solo album featuring Arphaporn Nakhonsawan, Pornchita "Benz" Na Songkhla, Pamela Bowden and Luk Nok Supaporn) released August 2007
Listen
 Album "Su Kho Sa Mo Sorn" with Nim from True AF 5 released March 2009
 Album "Rue Doo Hang Kwan Rak", a cooperation between True Fantasia and Sure Entertainment, released February 2010
 Single "Khad Kwam Aob Aun Yang Rang" and "Roy Yim Peun Nam Ta" in "The Winners" album with all AF winners season 1–6

Drama Series
 Kling Wai Kon Pho Sorn Wai – Episode: Boundless Friendship (Channel 7)
 Puen Rak Nak La Fun (Channel 7)
 Tam Roy Poh (Modern Nine TV)
 Khun Noo Chan Ta Na (Channel 3)
 Sa Pai Chao Sua (Channel 3)
 Koo Rak Chak Sok (True Hayha)
 Saphan Sang Dao (Thai PBS)

Movies
 The One (Phranakorn Film) on Theatre 23 August 2007
Official Site
 Konbuy The Movie (Sahamongkol Film) on Theatre 27 December 2007
Official Site

Book
 Aof Supanat (Thunder Publishing) released October 2006

Ads
 Close-Up toothpaste (2006)
Ads 1 : When Aof Was Challenged

Ads 2 : When Aof's Teeth was White and Clean

Ads 3 : 10 baht Close-Up
 Honda Click (2006)
Honda Click
 TrueMove Chaiyo Sim (2007)
TrueMove Chaiyo Sim
 Brand Ambassador for Muang Thai Life Assurance (2009)
 Krungsri AF The Winner debit card (2010)

Play
 As Tee in AF The Musical : Ngern Ngern Ngern (31 March – 8 April 2007, 12 rounds)
 As Koro in AF The Musical : Jojosan – adapted from Puccini's Madame Butterfly (9–31 August 2008, 19 rounds)

Awards
 The Winner of UBC Academy Fantasia Season 2 (2005)
 Khom Chad Leuk Awards: Popular New Artist 2006 from Kom Chad Leuk Newspaper
 Sudsapda Awards Young & Smart Vote : Popular Artist 2006 from Sudsapda Magazine

External links
 Aof's Personal Webpage
 Aof's Fansite

Supanat Chalermchaichareonkij
Supanat Chalermchaichareonkij
Supanat Chalermchaichareonkij
Living people
1986 births
Supanat Chalermchaichareonkij